The Japanese Garden is a municipal park on the Avenue Princesse Grace, in the Larvotto ward of Monaco. It is next to the Grimaldi Forum convention centre. The garden is 0.7 hectares in size, and features a stylised mountain, hill, waterfall, beach, brook, and a Zen garden for meditation. It is open daily from 9:00 to sunset.

The garden was designed by Yasuo Beppu, the winner of the Flower Exhibition of Osaka 1990, as a miniature representation of Shintoist philosophy.

Gallery

References

External links
A detailed description of the Japanese Garden from JGarden

Gardens in Monaco
Japanese gardens
Japan–Monaco relations